Al Furjan is a rapid transit station on the Red Line of the Dubai Metro in Dubai, UAE, serving Al Furjan and surrounding areas in Jebel Ali.

The station opened as part of Route 2020, created to link to Expo 2020, on 1 January 2021. It is located on an elevated section of the metro above Gardens Boulevard, on the boundary between Al Furjan and Discovery Gardens.  it is the final station in operation on Route 2020. Beyond this station, the metro line goes underground.

References

Railway stations in the United Arab Emirates opened in 2021
Dubai Metro stations